Neuton Chikhli Kalan is a Town and a Nagar Panchayat in Chhindwara district in the Indian state of Madhya Pradesh, India.

Demographics
 India census, Neuton Chikhli Kalan had a population of 10,850. Males constitute 52% of the population and females 48%. Neuton Chikhli Kalan has an average literacy rate of 68%, higher than the national average of 59.5%: male literacy is 76%, and female literacy is 59%. In Neuton Chikhli Kalan, 12% of the population is under 6 years of age.

References

Cities and towns in Chhindwara district